As of 1996, China–Kyrgyzstan relations were an area of substantial uncertainty for the government in Bishkek. The free-trade zone in Naryn attracted large numbers of Chinese businesspeople, who came to dominate most of the republic's import and export of small goods. Most of this trade is in barter conducted by ethnic Kyrgyz or Kazakhs who are Chinese citizens. The Kyrgyzstani government had expressed alarm over the numbers of Chinese who were moving into Naryn and other parts of Kyrgyzstan, but no preventive measures had been taken as of 1996.

Migration

Relations between the two nations are hindered by the fact, that China does not want the independence of Kyrgyzstan, a Turkic state, to encourage Turkic inhabitants of China's Xinjiang province, to pursue their own independence. There is some anti-Uygur sentiment in Kyrgyzstan. Daniar Usenov, who became the Prime Minister of Kyrgyzstan in 2009, received accolades from multiple Kyrgyzstan newspapers by articulating the fear in 1999 that Kyrgyzstan would become "Uygurstan" through an alleged Chinese plot of miscegenation. Kyrgyzstan refused to permit the formation of an Uygur party.

Trade

In the 1990s, trade with China grew enormously. Particularly important is the re-export of Chinese consumer goods to the neighboring  Uzbekistan (mostly via   Karasuu Bazar at Kara-Suu, Osh Province) and to Kazakhstan and Russia (mostly via Dordoy Bazaar in Bishkek).  Due to its linguistic and cultural affinity with the Chinese (particularly, Hui) people, Kyrgyzstan's small Dungan community plays a significant role in the trade. In some political quarters, the prospect of Chinese domination stimulated nostalgia for the days of Moscow's control.

As of 2019, China is one of the main trade and economic partners of Kyrgyzstan. China is also the main bilateral creditor of Kyrgyzstan. Their economic relationship is highly asymmetrical as "[w]hile for China the bilateral projects in Kyrgyzstan are small, they are significant for Kyrgyzstan".

Territorial claims 
China had historically claimed large tracts of Kyrgyzstan's territory, encompassing almost the whole of the country. According to Chinese historians, in the second half of the 19th century, China's Qing dynasty was forced to enter into a number of unequal treaties in which Kyrgyz lands, particularly the North Kyrgyz lands, were ceded to the Russian Empire in 1863.

After the dissolution of the Soviet Union, Kyrgyzstan and the two other Central Asian republics bordering the People's Republic of China inherited the border disputes that the USSR and PRC had themselves inherited from the Russian and Qing Empires. In 1996, the two countries signed their first border treaty. It was ratified in 1998. That first treaty demarcated approximately 900 km of the countries' 1,011 km of shared border. A second border agreement was signed in 1999 by President Chinese Jiang Zemin and Kyrgyzstan President Askar Akaev. In that agreement, China received 90,000 hectares in the Uzengi-Kuush region in exchange for Kyrgyzstan receiving two-thirds of Khan Tengri peak and Victory Peak.

Cooperation
Recent events in Kyrgyzstan have been of great concern to China, not only because of the issue over the Uygurs, but also due to problems with narcotic trafficking. During the 2005 Tulip Revolution China considered developments in Kyrgyzstan so important that they raised the possibility of deploying combat forces.

Kyrgyzstan and China have concluded joint military exercises several times. Kyrgyzstan has participated in the Shanghai Cooperation Organisation's series of joint military exercises (titled "Peace Mission") several times, alongside Russia, China, Kazakhstan, and Tajikistan. Kyrgyzstan participated in the 2010, 2012, and 2014 exercises. Kyrgyzstan has also participated in the SCO's "anti-terrorist exercises" with China and other SCO countries, doing so first in 2002 and subsequently in 2003, 2006, and 2010.

See also
 China–Kyrgyzstan border
 Foreign relations of China
 Foreign relations of Kyrgyzstan

Further reading

References

 
Kyrgyzstan
Bilateral relations of Kyrgyzstan